This is a list of meat-based sauces, consisting of sauces prepared using various types of meats as a primary ingredient. Meat-based sauces are commonly served with or over rice, pasta, or other starches. Thick meat-based sauces are sometimes used as sandwich fillings.

Meat-based sauces
 Amatriciana, an Italian sauce containing tomatoes and pancetta
 Carbonara, an Italian sauce containing guanciale or pancetta and eggs
 Caruso sauce, an Uruguayan sauce of ham, cream, nuts and mushrooms served over pasta.
 Cincinnati chili, a regional ground beef and tomato sauce typically served over pasta or hot dogs. Similar sauces are served on chili dogs or Coney Islands in Michigan, Rhode Island, and New York.
Curry, a variety of southeast Asian-style sauces that can include meat, poultry, seafood, tofu, or vegetables braised with tomato puree, broth, coconut milk, yogurt, or other ingredients, often served over rice.
Madras curry sauce is a south-Indian style red curry sauce.
Massaman curry, a Thai curry 
Jajang, a meat and vegetable sauce that tops noodles in the Korean-style Chinese dish Jajangmyeon.
Korma, an Indian sauce made with meat and/or vegetables braised in yogurt and served with rice.
Palaver sauce, a west African stew-like sauce containing vegetables, meat and/or seafood, and served with rice, fufu, or other starches.
 Picadillo, a thick sauce of tomatoes and ground beef traditional to multiple cuisines with regional variations
 Ragù, an Italian meat-based sauce with numerous variations
Barese ragù, an Italian sauce containing pork and lamb
Bolognese, an Italian ground beef, veal or pork sauce typically served over pasta
Neapolitan ragù, an Italian meat sauce
Ragù alla salsiccia, an Italian sausage-based sauce
Saltsa kima, a Greek topping for spaghetti.
Satsivi, a Georgian dish of chicken in walnut sauce.
Sausage gravy, a sausage-based white sauce served with or over biscuits in the American south.
 Sloppy Joe, a thick sauce of tomatoes and ground beef often served as sandwich filling

See also

 List of sauces

References

 
Meat-based sauces